The Ferrari 246 P F1 was a Formula One race car prototype used by Ferrari in 1960. It was Ferrari's first mid-engined car. It made only two World Championship appearances, with its best result being fifth place at the 1960 Italian Grand Prix.

Development
The disappointing form of the Ferrari 246 in 1959, along with the continuing rise of Cooper and Lotus, finally convinced Enzo Ferrari that the future lay in rear-engine cars. The 246P was developed in secret by a team led by Carlo Chiti. After sorting its tail-heavy weight distribution, it debuted at the 1960 Monaco Grand Prix, retiring on lap 70 with a failed differential, but classified sixth.

156 F2
With the new 1.5 litre rules due to come into force in 1961, the 246P was then pressed into service as a development mule for the revised V6 engine, in which guise it could compete in the existing Formula Two class. It made a single World Championship appearance, at the 1960 Italian Grand Prix, finishing fifth, but won the Formula Two Solitude Grand Prix.

Complete Formula One World Championship results
(key)(results in bold indicate pole position, results in italics indicate fastest lap)

* Includes points scored by the Ferrari 246

References

External links
Ferrari 246 P F1: Ferrari History
Ferrari 156 F2: Ferrari History

246 P
Rear mid-engine, rear-wheel-drive vehicles